Edward Critchley (31 December 1903 – 1996) was an English footballer. A First Division championship winner with Everton, he has been described as "the finest 'home grown' player ever produced by Stockport County".

Career

Stockport County
Critchley played local football for Spring Gardens, Stockport Union Chapel, Cheadle and Witton Albion before joining Stockport County via Stalybridge Celtic in 1922. He made his debut on 9 December 1922, in a 2–0 defeat to Port Vale at The Old Recreation Ground. His second appearance came on the last day of the 1922–23 season, as the "Hatters" secured their Second Division status with a 3–0 win over Southampton at Edgeley Park. Countey retained their second tier status in 1923–24 and 1924–25, before finishing at the bottom of the division in 1925–26. He was too good a player to remain in the Third Division North for long in 1926–27. He played 118 games for County before being transferred to Everton for a £2,500 fee in December 1926.

Everton
In his first game for the "Toffees" he provided the crosses for Dixie Dean to score four goals in a 5–4 win against Sunderland. In his first full season at Goodison Park, 1927–28, Everton won the First Division league title. He provided many of the passes that enabled Dixie Dean's record-breaking 60 goals. However Everton dropped to 18th in 1928–29, before being relegated in last place in 1929–30. Everton then won the Second Division championship in 1930–31, and won the First Division title again in 1931–32. They dropped to 11th in 1932–33, and Critchley missed the FA Cup Final victory over Manchester City at Wembley  after he had scored the winning goal in the semi-final victory over West Ham United, with Albert Geldard selected ahead of him for the final. The 1933–34 season was his last for Everton. In all, Critchley scored 42 goals in 230 games for Everton before being transferred to Preston North End in 1934.

Later career
After playing in the first 11 games of the season, he lost his place in the Preston team. He was transferred to Port Vale with cash in exchange for John Friar in December 1934. However he lost his place in the Vale team in early April 1935, and was released at the end of the season and moved on to South Liverpool.

Career statistics
Source:

Honours
Everton
 FA Community Shield: 1928 & 1932
 Football League First Division: 1927–28 & 1931–32
 Football League Second Division: 1930–31

References

1903 births
1996 deaths
English footballers
Association football forwards
Footballers from Ashton-under-Lyne
Witton Albion F.C. players
Stalybridge Celtic F.C. players
Stockport County F.C. players
Everton F.C. players
Preston North End F.C. players
Port Vale F.C. players
South Liverpool F.C. players
Macclesfield Town F.C. players
English Football League players